Pavlof may refer to:

 Pavlof Bay, a bay in Alaska, United States
 Mount Pavlof, a volcano in Alaska, United States
 Pavlof Sister, a volcano in Alaska, United States

See also
 Pavlov (disambiguation)